Richard Teller Crane II (August 12, 1882 - October 3, 1938) was the first United States diplomat accredited to Czechoslovakia with the title Envoy Extraordinary and Minister Plenipotentiary. He received a recess appointment from President Woodrow Wilson on April 23, 1919 and was subsequently confirmed by the United States Senate on June 26, 1919. Crane presented his credentials to the Czechoslovak government on June 11, 1919 and remained in office until December 5, 1921.

Biography
He was born on August 12, 1882 in Denver, Colorado to Charles Richard Crane, a diplomat and supporter of President Wilson. He was the grandson of Richard Teller Crane I, a Chicago manufacturer.  He married Ellen Douglas Bruce in 1909 and they made their home at the Westover plantation in Charles City County, Virginia.

He died by suicide on October 3, 1938 after firing his shotgun to his temple at his estate, Westover Plantation. The initial news reports indicated it was a "hunting accident". He was buried in the Westover estate burial grounds.

References

1882 births
1938 deaths
People from Denver
Ambassadors of the United States to Czechoslovakia
Suicides by firearm in Virginia